The 1971–72 season was the 99th season of competitive football in Scotland and the 75th season of Scottish league football.

Scottish League Division One

Champions: Celtic 
Relegated: Clyde, Dunfermline

Scottish League Division Two

Promoted: Dumbarton, Arbroath

Cup honours

Other honours

National

County

 – aggregate over two legs

Highland League

Individual honours

Scotland national team

1972 British Home Championship – Joint winners with 

Key:
(H) = Home match
(A) = Away match
ECQG5 = European Championship qualifying – Group 5
BHC = British Home Championship
BIC = Brazilian Independence Cup

See also
1971–72 Rangers F.C. season

Notes and references

External links
Scottish Football Historical Archive

 
Seasons in Scottish football